Mimosa invisa is a species of leguminous woody shrub or vine native to South America. Mimosa invisa includes two subspecies, each with two varieties:  The species is considered to be noxious and invasive in much of the United States.

Mimosa invisa Martius ex Colla
Mimosa invisa invisa Barneby
Mimosa invisa invisa var. invisa Barneby - native to Brazil and Paraguay
Mimosa invisa invisa var. macrostachya (Bentham) Barneby - native to Brazil and Paraguay
Mimosa invisa spiciflora (Karsten) Barneby
Mimosa invisa spiciflora var. spiciflora Barneby - native to northern South America
Mimosa invisa spiciflora var. tovarensis (Bentham) Barneby - native to Venezuela

References

invisa